is a passenger railway station located in the Yoshinaga neighborhood of the city of Bizen, Okayama Prefecture, Japan, operated by the West Japan Railway Company (JR West).

Lines

Station layout
The station consists of one ground-level side platform and one island platform. The station building is located adjacent to Platform 1 of the side platform, and to Platforms 2 and 3 on the island platform are connected by a footbridge. Most trains use Platforms 1 and 3, and Platform 2 is used only for return trains between Okayama Station and this station (two round trips per day).

Platforms

History
Yoshinaga Station was opened on 18 March 1891. With the privatization of Japanese National Railways (JNR) on 1 April 1987, the station came under the control of JR West.

Passenger statistics
In fiscal 2019, the station was used by an average of 430 passengers daily

Surrounding area
Bizen City Yoshinaga General Branch
 Bizen City National Health Insurance Municipal Yoshinaga Hospital

See also
List of railway stations in Japan

References

External links

 JR West Station Official Site

Railway stations in Okayama Prefecture
Sanyō Main Line
Railway stations in Japan opened in 1891
Bizen, Okayama